Christ is Made the Sure Foundation is a Christian hymn, translated in 1851 by John Mason Neale from the second part of the 6th or 7th century Latin monastic hymn Urbs beata Jerusalem.

While originally an unaccompanied plainsong melody, the hymn is now commonly sung to either the tune of Westminster Abbey, adapted from the final section of Henry Purcell's anthem O God, thou art my God; or the tune of Regent Square, composed by Henry Smart. The texts of modern versions of the hymn vary substantially from Neale's original translations.

The hymn was sung during the marriage ceremonies of Princess Margaret and Antony Armstrong-Jones in 1960, and Prince Charles and Lady Diana Spencer in 1981, and was the opening hymn of the Queen's Platinum Jubilee service in St Paul's Cathedral on 3 June 2022. It was also sung during the funeral proceedings of Elizabeth II, at St George’s Chapel, Windsor Castle on 19 September 2022.

References

External links 

 Christ is Made the Sure Foundation at Hymnary.org
 The full text of Neale's 1867 translation at Wikisource.org

Christian hymns
English Christian hymns
Hymns in The English Hymnal
19th-century hymns